Luc Steels (born in 1952) is a Belgian scientist and artist. Steels is considered a pioneer of Artificial Intelligence in Europe who has made contributions to expert systems, behavior-based robotics, artificial life and evolutionary computational linguistics. He was a fellow of the Catalan Institution for Research and Advanced Studies ICREA associated as a research professor with the Institute for Evolutionary Biology (UPF/CSIC) in Barcelona. He was formerly founding Director of the Artificial Intelligence Laboratory of the Vrije Universiteit Brussel and founding director of the Sony Computer Science Laboratory in Paris. Steels has also been active in the arts collaborating with visual artists and theater makers and composing music for opera.

Biography 
Steels obtained a master's degree in Computer Science at MIT, specializing in AI under the supervision of Marvin Minsky and Carl Hewitt. He obtained a Ph.D. at the University of Antwerp with a thesis in computational linguistics on a parallel model of parsing. In 1980, he joined the Schlumberger-Doll Research Laboratory in Ridgefield (US) to work on knowledge-based approaches to the interpretation of oil well logging data and became leader of the group who developed the Dipmeter Advisor which he transferred into industrial use while at Schlumberger Engineering, Clamart (Paris). In 1983, he was appointed tenured professor in Computer Science with a chair in AI at the Free University of Brussels (VUB). The same year he founded the VUB Artificial Intelligence Laboratory and became the first chairman of the VUB Computer Science Department from 1990 to 1995. The VUB AI Lab focused initially on knowledge-based systems for various industrial applications (equipment diagnosis, transport scheduling, design) but gradually focused more on basic research in AI, moving at the cutting edge of the field.

In 1996 Steels founded the Sony Computer Science Laboratory (CSL) in Paris and became its acting director. This laboratory was a spin-off from the Sony Computer Science Laboratory in Tokyo directed by Mario Tokoro and Toshi Doi. The laboratory targeted cutting-edge research in AI, particularly on the emergence and evolution of grounded language and ontologies on robots, the use of AI in music, and contributions to sustainability. The CSL music group was directed by Francois Pachet and the sustainability group by Peter Hanappe.

In 2011 Steels became fellow at the Institute for Research and Advanced Studies (ICREA) and research professor at the Universitat Pompeu Fabra (UPF) in Barcelona, embedded in the Evolutionary Biology Laboratory (IBE). There he pursued further his fundamental research in the origins and evolution of language through experiments with robotic agents.

Throughout his career Steels spent many research and educational visits to other institutions. He was a regular lecturer at the Theseus International Management Institute in Sophia Antipolis, developed courses for the Open University in the Netherlands, was Fellow at the Wissenschaftskolleg in Berlin during the years 2015-16 and 2009–10, Fellow at Goldsmiths College London (computer science department) from 2010, visiting scholar or lecturer at La Sapienza University Rome, Politecnico di Milano, the universities of Ghana and Beijing (Jiaotong University) among others.

Steels was member of the New York Academy of Sciences, and is elected member of the Academia Europaea, and the Royal Belgian Academy of Arts and Sciences (Koninklijke Vlaamse Academie voor Wetenschappen en Kunsten),  where he serves as chairman of the Natural Science section.

He received several awards including the best paper award at the European Conference in AI (in 1982), the prestigious Franqui chair lectures at the University of Leuven (Belgium) (2018) and the EurAI Distinguished Service Award, presented every two years to an individual who has made exceptional contributions to the AI community in Europe.

Contributions to science 
The scientific work of Steels has always been highly trans-disciplinary, focusing on (i) forging conceptual breakthroughs in AI, (ii) building the technical tools to work out and develop these breakthroughs, and (iii) developing concrete experiments to turn the breakthroughs into viable new AI paradigms. Since the early 1980s and using this approach, Steels has played a significant role in four profound conceptual shifts: (1) from heuristic rule-based systems to model-based knowledge systems, (2) from model-based to behaviour-based, Artificial Life inspired robots, (3) from static, engineered language systems to dynamic, evolving emergent communication systems with key features of human languages, and (4) most recently from data-driven AI to meaningful AI capable of understanding and forms of awareness.

The knowledge-level in expert systems 
The early 1980s saw a period of high interest in the application of the rule-based paradigm for building expert systems. Expert systems are intended to assist human experts in tackling challenging problems, such as medical diagnosis (e.g. MYCIN) or the configuration of complex technical equipment (e.g. R1) . By the mid-1980s these techniques became widely used in industry and integrated in software engineering practice, but it also became clear that the exclusive focus on heuristic rules was limiting, primarily because of the efforts involved in finding an adequate set of rules (the so-called knowledge acquisition bottleneck) and because of brittleness seen when cases appeared that fell outside the scope of predefined rules.

From 1985 a trend among AI researchers, including Balakrishnan Chandrasekaran, William Clancey, Doug Lenat, John McDermott, Tom Mitchell, Bob Wielinga, a.o., arose to capture human expertise in more depth. Triggered by Allen Newell's paper on the need to adopt a `knowledge-level' analysis and design strategy,  the new generation of knowledge systems used models of the problem domain based on an explicitly represented ontology and employing problem solving strategies to compose tasks into subtasks and solving them. Heuristic rules were still relevant but they would now be learned by first solving a problem using models and inference strategies and by then storing the solution, after some degree of abstraction. The key advantages of this knowledge level approach are more robustness, because the system can fall back on deeper reasoning when heuristic rules are missing, a richer explanation facility because of the use of deeper models, and a more methodical design process including techniques for verification and validation.

Steels played a significant role in establishing this new paradigm in the 1980s, organising a number of key workshops and tutorials, helping to develop knowledge level design methodologies, particularly in collaboration with Bob Wielinga and the CommonKADS approach developed at the University of Amsterdam, and publishing influential papers outlining the knowledge level approach.

With his team at the AI Lab of the Vrije Universiteit Brussel, he developed various tools, most importantly the knowledge representation system KRS, which was a frame-based object-oriented extension of LISP with facilities for truth maintenance, meta-level inference and computational reflection. The team applied the approach for building challenging operational expert systems in various technical domains (electronic circuit design for digital telephone, scheduling of Belgian railway traffic, monitoring of subway and diagnosis of nuclear power stations). These systems became used in real operation and ran on the innovative Symbolics LISP machines. It all lead to the creation of a spin-off company Knowledge Technologies (with Kris Van Marcke as CEO) to further channel these developments into practical industrial use. The company was active from 1986 to 1995.

Artificial Life and Behavior-based Robotics. 
Around 1986, after an encounter with Ilya Prigogine from the Free University of Brussels (ULB), Steels opened in his VUB laboratory a second research line to develop a new paradigm for AI inspired by living systems. Because this paradigm rose as a part of the movement towards `Artificial Life', it became known as the Artificial Life approach to AI or also, because of the emphasis on behavior, as the behavior-based approach to AI and robotics, as well as the animat approach. The behavior-based paradigm was intended to be complementary to the knowledge-based paradigm, which targets deliberative intelligence, in that it tackles reactive intelligence for real time adaptive behavior of autonomous robotic agents embodied in real world environments. This new research line was at the confluence of several emerging trends happening in the late nineteen-eighties and nineteen-nineties: A revival of cybernetic reactive robots spearheaded by Rodney Brooks, the establishment of Artificial Life shaped as a new discipline by Chris Langton, a renewed focus on emergent computation through self-organisation using cellular automata, models from chaos theory, and genetic algorithms, and the rise of multi-layered neural networks initiated by David Rumelhart and James McClelland.

As in the case of knowledge based systems,Steels was very active in establishing the new paradigm by organising a series of key workshops, conferences and summer and spring schools and by writing some influential papers to define the new paradigm. With his team in Brussels, he worked out hardware platforms (using self-designed processing boards, Lego and simple electronics parts, with Tim Smithers taking the lead) and software platforms including PDL (Process Description Language). He also set up various robotic experiments, the most important one being the self-sufficiency experiment, initiated with ethologist David McFarland.

The self-sufficiency experiment was based on Walter Grey's electric tortoise experiment from the 1950s. This experiment featured simple automatons (animats) capable of wall following, phototaxis and finding and using a charging station. The McFarland-Steels experiment added the additional challenge of having multiple competing robots and competition for the energy in the charging station so that the robots had to do work. The experimental setup functioned for a decade as a framework for experiments in adaptive behavior, genetic algorithms and reinforcement learning by several generations of students at the VUB AI Lab with Andreas Birk taking the lead.

Fluid Construction Grammar and the evolution of language in artificial systems 
In 1995, after a visit to the Sony Computer Science Laboratory in Tokyo at the invitation of Mario Tokoro, Steels opened a new chapter in his research endeavours, bringing the evolutionary thinking from Artificial Life and the advances in behavior-based robotics to bear on the question how it could be possible for a population of agents to autonomously self-organise an evolving adaptive language to communicate about the world as perceived through their sensory-motor apparatus. A new team of collaborators was set up at the VUB AI lab and at the newly founded Sony Computer Science Laboratory in Paris and worked for two decades (from 1995 to 2015) on this topic.

The first breakthroughs were reached around 1996 in the domain of phonetics and phonology. Steels proposed a self-organisation approach to the origins of speech sounds and phonetic structures. Experiments were set up in which a population of agents, equipped with a basic vocal apparatus and auditory system, developed a shared inventory of speech sounds by playing imitation games, introducing variations generating new sounds and adapting to the sounds of others. These experiments were worked out in the ph.D dissertations of Bart de Boer, and Pierre-Yves Oudeyer.

In parallel, Steels proposed in 1995 the Naming Game to study the origins of linguistic conventions in general and the formation of lexicons in particular. The Naming Game is a language game played by a population of agents. In each interaction the speaker chooses a topic and uses one or more words to draw attention of the listener to the topic. The game is a success if the reader pays attention to the topic chosen by the listener and both agents reinforce their existing inventory. Otherwise, speakers may invent new words, listeners adopt new words, and both change the associative scores between words and meanings in their respective inventories. In a concrete experiment, agents start without an initial vocabulary and gradually invent new words and coordinate their usage of words in local interactions. Nevertheless, a coherent vocabulary gradually emerges and gets maintained when the population changes or new topics come up.

In 1996 Steels introduced the Discrimination Game as a way to study the origins of meanings and later on (in 2014) the Syntax Game for studying the emergence of syntax. The Language Game paradigm has been productive to study a wide range of issues in the emergence and evolution of language, first in theoretical work, with mathematical proofs that populations can indeed reach coherence (achieved in 2005 by Bart de Vylder and Karl Tuyls) and with the discovery of scaling laws in relation to the growth of populations and the growth of possible topics (achieved in 2007 by Andrea Baronchelli  and Vittorio Loreto).

Progressively the complexity of the emergent languages increased to include the emergence of morphology and syntax and more and more conceptual domains were tackled. Thus Steels has done in-depth research on color languages (with Tony Belpaeme and Joris Bleys), case systems (with Remi van Trijp and Pieter Wellens), spatial language (with Martin Loetzsch and Michael Spranger), agreement systems (with Katrien Beuls ), determiners (with Simon Pauw) and action languages (with Martin Loetzsch, Michael Spranger and Sebastian Höfer. Many of these achievements were shown to work in robotic experiments, first on simple lego-vehicles, then with vision-based agents in the 'Talking Heads Experiment'  and later on with the 4-legged Sony AIBO robot and the Sony humanoid robot QRIO.

In addition to the scientific research, Steels pushed the language game paradigm by the organisation of various summer schools (Erice 2004 & 2006, Cortona 2009 & 2013 and Como 2016), the founding of the Evolution of communication journal, the publication of key papers and collections of research works on language evolution. Steels also pushed forward the development and spreading of tools, in particular a software platform for doing experiments in language emergence called BABEL and a formalism for representing emergent grammars called Fluid Construction Grammar (FCG). Starting from 2000, Fluid Construction Grammar has gone through many design iterations to become the main operational paradigm for implementing computational construction grammar today.

Understanding and Awareness 
From around 2018 at the peak of advancements and applications in data-driven neural network style AI, Steels began to participate in efforts to create a more balanced human-centric (also called human-centered) form of AI. Together with Ramon Lopez de Mantaras he launched in 2018 the 'Barcelona declaration for the proper development and usage of artificial intelligence in Europe.' that influenced the European Ethical Guidelines for Trustworthy AI published in 2019. He also initiated the ethical AI workpackage in the large-scale AI4EU coordination project of the EU commission.

Arguing that we need more than regulations to make AI more human-centered Steels launched a number of projects to combine reactive intelligence (captured through neural network style systems) with the deliberative intelligence that was the focal point of earlier symbolic AI research. Concretely, the EU project MUHAI focuses on how the level of understanding in AI systems could be increased by building rich models of problem domains and problem situations and integrating a variety of knowledge sources (ontologies, language, vision and action, mental simulation, episodic memory and context models), and the EU project VALAWAI focuses on how AI systems can be made 'value-aware' by introducing attention mechanisms to deal with highly complex, uncertain fragmented inputs, and a component implementing `moral intelligence'.

Contributions to the arts 

The artistic work of Luc Steels has been trans-disciplinary as well, with interests, realisations and writings about the arts, music and theatre.

Avant-garde performance and electro-acoustic music 
In the early 1970s Luc Steels became active in Performance art, and in avant-garde electro-acoustic music. In 1972 he founded the collective 'Dr. Buttock's players pool', participated in the Welfare State theatre in 1977 and with performance artist Hugo Roelandt. In the music domain, he was part of the 1970s Antwerp Free Music scene, playing guitar in a style pioneered by Derek Bailey. In 1971 he co-founded the ensemble Mishalle-Geladi-Steels (MGS) with saxophonist Luc Mishalle and electronic musician Paul Mishalle. The ensemble frequently performed with the Studio for New Music set up by Joris De Laet, particularly at the ICC in Antwerp. Lifelong interactions originated from this period with artist Anne-Mie Van Kerckhoven, who Steels had invited as artist in residence at the University of Antwerp and later at the VUB AI laboratory in Brussels, and Peter Beyls, who was also artist in residence at the VUB AI Lab.

Art installations and cooperations 
After a period of total focus on scientific work while in the United States, Luc Steels returned to artistic activities from the 1980s onwards. Thanks to an encounter with H-U Obrist at the Burda Akademie symposium in Munich in 1995, he came into contact with a new generation of artists, resulting in public presentations in art contexts such as at the Bridge the Gap encounters  (2001 Kitakyushu), the Memory Marathon (Serpentine Gallery, London, 2007 & 2012), and the Experiment Marathon (Reykjavik 2008).   Within this artistic network Steels collaborated with several artists for the co-creation of new works, including with Carsten Holler (for the CapC Musee  in Bordeaux and the Koelnerische Kunstverein); with Olafur Eliasson for a piece 'Look into the box' for the Musee d'art moderne in Paris in 2002 and later shown at the Festival dei 2 Mondi (Spoleto, 2003), the ExploraScience Museum (Tokyo, 2006)), and other locations; with Sissel Tolaas for work shown at the Berlin Biennale; with Anne-Mie van Kerckhoven at the NeuerAachenerKunstverein; and with Armin Linke and Giuliana Bruno for the New Alphabeth (Stop Making Sense) exhibition at the Haus der Kulturen der Welt (Berlin);  Steels participated with his own installations in various art-science exhibitions,the most important ones being Laboratorium curated by H-U Obrist and B. Vanderlinden in Antwerp in 1999, and N01SE in Cambridge (Kettle's Yard) and London (Wellcome Gallery) in 2000, curated by Adam Lowe and Simon Schaffer.

Theatre and opera 
The life-long interest of Luc Steels in performance and theatre was rekindled in 2004 by a collaboration with theatre director Jean-Francois Peyret on a commissioned play about the Russian mathematician Sofya Kovalevskaya for the Avignon Theatre Festival 2005 and performed in 2006 at the French National Theatre (Chaillot) in Paris.  From 2010, music and theatre came together in two opera projects with neuroscientist Oscar Vilarroya as libretist and Luc Steels as composer. The first opera entitled Casparo premiered at the Palau de la Musica in Barcelona in 2011 and was later performed in Brussels (Theatre Moliere) 2013, Tokyo (Sony Concert Hall) in 2013, Leuven BE (Iers College) in 2014 and Paris (Jussieu Theatre) in 2014. The second opera, entitled Fausto had avant-premiere performances in La Gaite Lyrique (Paris) in 2016 and the Monnaie Opera House (Brussels in 2017)  with full performances at the And&MindGate Festival (Leuven BE, 2018) and at the Homo Roboticus event at the Brussels Monnaie Opera House in 2019. Most of these performances were conducted by Kris Stroobants with the Frascati Symphonic Orchestra, the choir La Folia, and various solists, including Reinoud van Mechelen and Pablo Lopez Martin (Mallorca opera). The operas are written in a neo-classical, post modern musical style and elaborate societal and trans-humanistic issues raised by the use of Artificial Intelligence, including the occurrence of a singularity and the possibility of immortality through virtual agents.

Essays and art curation 
Luc Steels curated a number of international exhibitions, including Intensive Science at La Maison Rouge in Paris (in 2006 and 2008), artes@ijcai at the Centro Borges in Buenos Aires (Argentinia) in 2015 and the 'Aqua Granda. Una Memoria Digitale' exhibition at the Science Gallery Venice in 2021.

He contributed with essays on art and music for journals such as KunstForum and Janus Magazine (Issue 20), and for exhibition catalogs, He also wrote academic papers on computer music and art interpretation.

In 2020, Steels was S+T+ARTS 'scientist  in residence' at the Luc Tuymans art studio, 'Studio Tuymans' in Antwerp, which resulted in an exhibition at the BOZAR museum in Brussels based on the use of AI methods to interpret a single art work by painter Luc Tuymans called 'Secrets'.

See also 
Behavior based robotics
Evolutionary linguistics
Fluid construction grammar

Notes and references

Bibliography 
Steels, Luc (1990) "Components of Expertise" AI Magazine 11(2) pp. 28–49. 
Steels, Luc (2001) Grounding Symbols through Evolutionary Language Games. In: Cangelosi A. and Parisi D. (Eds.) Simulating the Evolution of Language Springer.
Steels, Luc (2011) "Design Patterns in Fluid Construction Grammar" John Benjamins Pub. 
Amsterdam.

References

External links 
Luc Steels (ICREA)
Luc Steels (Institut de Biologia Evolutiva)
Luc Steels (Sony CSL Paris)
Luc Steels (Artificial Intelligence Laboratory, VUB, Brussels)

–

1952 births
Living people
Flemish scientists
Artificial intelligence researchers
Members of the Royal Flemish Academy of Belgium for Science and the Arts